Mumej Kheyl (also Romanized as Mūmej Kheyl and Mowmj-e Kheyl; also known as Mamaj Kheyl, Momjeh Kheyl, Mumejeheil, and Mumejekhel) is a village in Valupey Rural District, in the Central District of Savadkuh County, Mazandaran Province, Iran. At the 2006 census, its population was 266, in 76 families.

References 

Populated places in Savadkuh County